Lea or LEA may refer to:

Places

Australia 
 Lea River, Tasmania, Australia
 Lake Lea, Tasmania, from which the Lea River flows
 RAAF Base Learmonth, IATA airport code "LEA"

England 
 Lea, Cheshire, a civil parish
 Lea, Derbyshire, a settlement in the civil parish of Dethick, Lea and Holloway
 Lea, Devon, a location
 Lea, Herefordshire, a village and civil parish
 Lea, Lancashire, a village
 Lea, Lincolnshire, a small village and civil parish
 Lea, Lydham, a location in Shropshire
 Lea, Pontesbury, a location in Shropshire
 Lea, Wiltshire, a village
 River Lea, a tributary of the Thames
 Lea Bridge, Greater London, the area around the bridge over the River Lea
 Lea Bridge Road, which crosses the bridge above

Spain 
 Lea, a river in Biscay, Basque Country

United States 
 Lea County, New Mexico

People
 Lea (given name)
 Lea (surname)
 Lea (musician), a German singer-songwriter and keyboardist
 Lea baronets, a title in the baronetage of the United Kingdom
 Lea Salonga, a Filipina singer, actress, and columnist

Arts and entertainment
 Liberian Entertainment Awards (LEA), an annual Liberian music awards show
 Léa (film), a 2011 French film
 Lea (album), a 1988 studio album by Lea Salonga
 Lea (film), a 1997 Czech drama directed by Ivan Fíla
 "Lea", a song by Toto from their 1986 album Fahrenheit
 Lea Salonga (album), a 1993 studio album by Lea Salonga

Business
Lea-Francis, a motor manufacturing company founded by R. H. Lea and G. I. Francis 
Lea & Perrins or L&P, a United Kingdom-based subsidiary of Kraft Heinz
Lear Corporation, NYSE symbol is LEA

Education 
 Lea College, Albert Lea, Minnesota, US, a private liberal arts college from 1966 to 1973
 Local education authority, a public body in the United Kingdom

Government and politics 
 Labour Electoral Association, British Liberal-Labour organisation
 Law enforcement agency, or law enforcement authority, in North America
 Local electoral area, a district for local elections in Ireland

Military 
 Operation Léa, a French Union operation during the First Indochina War
 USS Lea (DD-118), a destroyer that served during both world wars

Technology 
 LEA (cipher), a lightweight block cipher
 Load effective address, a computer instruction
 Length extension attack, a cryptographic attack
 LEA, a General Motors car engine; see GM Ecotec engine
 LEA, a Honda car engine; see Honda L engine

Other uses
 Lea, a genus of katydid
 LEA proteins (Late Embryogenesis Abundant proteins)
 Lea test or LEA Vision Test System, a series of pediatric vision tests designed specifically for children who do not know how to read the letters of the alphabet that are typically used in eye charts
 Lea (unit) of length
 Shabunda Lega language of the DRC, ISO 639-3 code
 Leagrave railway station, United Kingdom station code
 Lea, an Old English word that refers to a field, meadow, or forest clearing

See also
 Small River Lea, a tributary of the River Lea
 Leah (disambiguation)
 Lee (disambiguation)
 Leigh (disambiguation)
 LEAS (disambiguation)